WUME 95.3 FM is a radio station broadcasting a hot adult contemporary format. Licensed to Paoli, Indiana, the station is owned by Diamond Shores Broadcasting, LLC.

References

External links
WUME's official website

UME